Calingiri Important Bird Area is an 807 km2 tract of land roughly centred on the town of Calingiri in the Wheatbelt region of Western Australia.  It lies about 120 km north-east of Perth.  It has been classified by BirdLife International as an Important Bird Area because it supports up to 20 breeding pairs of short-billed black cockatoo, an endangered species that nests in remnant patches of eucalypt woodland and isolated paddock trees, and feeds in native shrublands.  The area also supports the restricted-range western corella and a globally important population of the western yellow robin.

References

Wheatbelt (Western Australia)
Important Bird Areas of Western Australia